Term ''kallikrein 7 may refer to:

 Stratum corneum chymotryptic enzyme, an enzyme class
 KLK7, a serine protease that in humans is encoded by the KLK7 gene